Guillaume is the French equivalent of William, which is of old Germanic origin.

People with this given name

Aristocrats
William the Conqueror (c. 1028 – 1087), in French Guillaume le Conquérant, Norman conqueror of England
William of Gellone (755-812/14), in French Guillaume d'Orange, Count of Toulouse and hero of the epic poem Chanson de Guillaume
Guillaume IV, Grand Duke of Luxembourg
Prince Guillaume of Luxembourg
Guillaume, Hereditary Grand Duke of Luxembourg (born 1981), heir apparent to the crown of Luxembourg

A
Guillaume Amontons
Guillaume Apollinaire (1880–1918), French poet, writer and art critic

B
Guillaume de Salluste Du Bartas
Guillaume du Bellay, seigneur de Langey (1491–1543), French diplomat and general
Guillaume de Bellecombe
Guillaume-François Berthier
Guillaume Beuzelin
Guillaume Cornelis van Beverloo (1922–2010), Dutch artist better known under the pseudonym Corneille
Guillaume Bigourdan
Guillaume aux Blanches Mains
Guillaume de Bonne-Carrere
Guillaume Briçonnet (Cardinal) (1445–1514)
 his son Guillaume Briçonnet (Bishop of Meaux) (1472–1534)
Guillaume Marie Anne Brune
Guillaume Budé (1467–1540), French scholar

C
Guillaume Cale
Guillaume Canet (born 1973), French actor
Guillaume de Chartres (disambiguation), several people
Guillaume Amfrye de Chaulieu
Guillaume Cheval dit St-Jacques
Guillaume Cizeron
Guillaume Costeley
Guillaume Courtois (1628–1679), French painter and etcher
Guillaume Coustou the Elder
Guillaume Coustou the Younger

D
Guillaume Dah Zadi (born 1978), Côte d'Ivoire footballer
Guillaume Daniel Delprat
Guillaume Delisle (1675–1726), French cartographer
Guillaume Depardieu (1971–2008), French actor
Guillaume Dode de la Brunerie
Guillaume Dubois (1775–1851), French soldier and Marshal of France
Guillaume Duchenne (1806–1875), French neurologist
Guillaume Dufay (1397–1474), Franco–Flemish composer and music theorist
Guillaume Henri Dufour (1787–1875), Swiss general and topographer who presided over the convention that established the International Red Cross
Guillaume Dufresne d'Arsel, 18th-century French colonial governor of Mauritius
Guillaume Philibert Duhesme
Guillaume Mathieu Dumas, Napoleonic general
Guillaume Dupuytren (1777–1835), French anatomist and surgeon
Guillaume Durand
Guillaume Durand (nephew)

E
Guillaume Elmont
Guillaume d'Estouteville

F
Guillaume-André Fauteux
Guillaume Faye
Guillaume Fichet
Guillaume de Fondaumière

G
Guillaume Gallienne
Guillaume Gamelin Gaucher
Guillaume Geefs
Guillaume de Gisors (1219–1307), grandson of Jean de Gisors
Guillaume Gontard (born 1971), French politician
Guillaume Gouffier, seigneur de Bonnivet (c. 1488 – 1525), French soldier
Guillaume Groen van Prinsterer (1801–1876), Dutch politician and historian
Guillaume Guiart

H
Guillaume Emmanuel Paul de Homem-Christo, musician better known as Guy-Manuel
Guillaume Huin d'Estaing (died 1452), antipope-appointed cardinal

K
Guillaume Knecht, rugby league footballer of the 1990s and 2000s

L
Guillaume de Lamoignon de Blancmesnil (1683–1772), French magistrate
Guillaume-Chrétien de Lamoignon de Malesherbes (1721–1794), French statesman
Guillaume Latendresse, National Hockey League player for the Minnesota Wild
Guillaume LeBlanc
Guillaume Lefebvre
Guillaume Le Gentil (1725–1792), French astronomer 
Guillaume Legrant
Guillaume Lekeu
Guillaume de l'Hôpital (1661–1704), French mathematician
Guillaume de Lorris

M
Guillaume de Machaut (1300–1377), French composer and poet
Guillaume Morel

N
Guillaume-Alphonse Nantel
Guillaume-Gabriel Nivers
Guillaume de Nogaret

O
Guillaume-Antoine Olivier

P
Guillaume de Palerme
Guillaume Patry, retired StarCraft professional. Played under the alias Grrrr...
Guillaume Pellicier, French diplomat
Guillaume-Lebrecht Petzold
Guillaume Postel
Guillaume Poyet
Guillaume de Puylaurens

R
Guillaume Raoux
Guillaume Thomas François Raynal
Guillaume Rocheron, Visual effects artist
Guillaume Rondelet (1507–1566), professor of medicine at the University of Montpellier
Guillaume-Joseph Roques
Guillaume François Rouelle

S
Guillaume Sarkozy (born 1951), French textile entrepreneur and vice-president of the MEDEF, the French union of employers
Guillaume Sayer
Guillaume de Sonnac
Guillaume Soro

T
Guillaume Tarrant
Guillaume De Tonquédec

V
Guillaume du Vair
Guillaume Vigneault

W
Guillaume Warmuz

See also
Guillaume (surname)
Guillaume (disambiguation)

References

French masculine given names